Darwaz Airport  is located next to the Panj River in Darwaz, which is the capital of Darwaz District in Badakhshan Province of Afghanistan. The name Darwaz is Persian and refers to an entry or a gateway. 

Darwaz Airport is believed to be for private use, but may also be used for emergency relief purposes by government agencies. On the other side of the Panj River is the village of Kevran in neighboring Tajikistan. 

The other nearest airports to Darwaz are Sheghnan Airport in the Shighnan District to the southeast, Yawan Airport in the Yawan District to the south, and Khwahan Airport in the Khwahan District to the southwest.

See also
List of airports in Afghanistan

References

External links 
 
 

Airports in Afghanistan
Buildings and structures in Badakhshan Province